Major General David Wilson,  (born 1949) is a retired senior Royal Marines officer who briefly served as Commandant General Royal Marines from February to August 2004.

Military career
Wilson joined the Royal Marines in 1969 and went on to serve in Northern Ireland in 1987. He was mentioned in despatches later that year "in recognition of distinguished service" during the deployment. He commanded the Special Boat Service, as well as being Commanding Officer of 45 Commando from 1993 and commander of 3 Commando Brigade from 1998. From December 1999 he was Chief of Staff at NATO Joint Headquarters North. He was later deployed to Kosovo, where he became co-chairman of the Kosovo Security Committee. He was the Senior British Representative to United States Central Command in Tampa, Florida, from October 2002 to October 2003 (in which role he was involved in planning for the Iraq War) and became Commandant General Royal Marines in February 2004, before retiring later that year.

Later life
In retirement, Wilson became Director of a United Nations programme engaged in disarming warlords and disbanding illegal armed groups in Afghanistan.

References

1949 births
Companions of the Order of the Bath
Commanders of the Order of the British Empire
Living people
Royal Marines generals
British military personnel of the Iraq War
British military personnel of The Troubles (Northern Ireland)
Military personnel of the Kosovo War